The North Cormorant River is a  tributary of the Blackduck River of Minnesota in the United States. It joins the Blackduck River shortly upstream of that river's mouth at Red Lake, the largest natural lake entirely within Minnesota.

See also
List of rivers of Minnesota

References

Minnesota Watersheds

USGS Hydrologic Unit Map - State of Minnesota (1974)

Rivers of Minnesota
Rivers of Beltrami County, Minnesota